Manihot pentaphylla is a crotonoid species in the spurge family. It has the synonyms Jatropha pentaphylla and Manihot uleana. M. pentaphylla contains the subspecies M. pentaphylla pentaphylla and M. pentaphylla graminifolia, both of which are on the IUCN Red List. The species was first described by H.S. Irwin et al. based on a specimen found in Goiás, Brazil.

References

Bibliography

Manihoteae
Flora of Goiás